"Lock and Key" is a moderate hit single recorded by Klymaxx for the MCA label. Relying on an outside producer and songwriters, this song was recorded and released as the fourth single from their fourth album, Meeting in the Ladies Room. This song reached number 47 on the Billboard R&B chart.

Credits
Lead vocals Lorena Porter
Background vocals by Klymaxx

References

1985 singles
Klymaxx songs
1984 songs
MCA Records singles